B45 may refer to:
 Bundesstraße 45, a German road
 B45 (New York City bus) in Brooklyn
 HLA-B45, a HLA-B serotype
 B-45 Tornado, a U.S. Air Force bomber aircraft of the late 1940s